
Léon (Lejb) Goldberg, called "Julien" (14 February 1924 in Łódź – 21 February 1944), was a Polish Jew and volunteer fighter in the French Liberation army FTP-MOI in the Manouchian Group.

Biography

Youth 
Goldberg was born in Łódź, Poland. In 1928, his father Samuel Goldberg (b. 1901), immigrated to France with his wife Riwka Gelemer and his son. They stayed in Paris where two other children were born, Henry in 1931 and Max in 1934.

World War II 
When the mass arrest of more than 13,000 Jews, the Vel' d'Hiv Roundup, was carried out in Paris on 16 July 1942, Léon's parents sent him and his two brothers into hiding with a neighbour. His parents were arrested; his father was held at Beaune-la-Rolande and Camp of Royallieu transit camps before being deported to Auschwitz concentration camp on 31 July 1942. His mother and two brothers were held at the Pithiviers and Drancy transit camps, and deported to Auschwitz on 19 August 1942.

Goldberg was known within the resistance under the pseudonym "Julien", and his false papers were in the name of "Gérard Charton".

On 23 September 1943 Goldberg, Joseph Boczov and two other fighters from the FTP-MOI took a train to Brie-Comte-Robert. From there they made their way to Coubert, where they sabotaged the railway. The next day they took the train to Lieusaint to return to Paris. 

On 21 October 1943 Goldberg, Boczov, Maurice Fingercwajg, Jonas Geduldig (called "Martiniuk"), Thomas Elek and a sixth resistance fighter, all from the MOI, left on a mission to stop a German convoy on the Paris-Troyes line at Grandpuits near Mormant. During the night they attacked a train with 51 wagons. 27 wagons were destroyed, blocking the two rails and destroying wheat, wood, assorted packages and aircraft engines. The guards were killed and the train driver was lightly injured. However, the fighters had been observed by the BS2. Three of the participants were killed or taken prisoner, and the other three escaped but were identified.

Goldberg was arrested at Mormant, and shot at the fort Mont Valérien on 21 February 1944 with the other members of the Affiche rouge.

See also 
 Francs-tireurs et partisans - Main-d'œuvre immigrée
 Affiche rouge
 French Resistance
 Brigades Spéciales
 Geheime Feld Polizei

External links 
  La journée d'un « Terroriste »
  Discours d'André Santini et Henry Karayan
  Article de Léon Goldberg
  Arrestation de Léon Goldberg

1924 births
1944 deaths
Jews in the French resistance
FTP-MOI
Polish Jews who died in the Holocaust
Executed Polish people
Resistance members killed by Nazi Germany
People executed by Germany by firearm
Polish people executed by Nazi Germany
Deaths by firearm in France
Executed people from Łódź Voivodeship
Polish emigrants to France
Military personnel from Łódź